Statistics of Football League First Division in the 1975–76 season.

Overview
Liverpool won the First Division title for the ninth time in the club's history that season and the first under manager Bob Paisley. They won the title on their last game of the season on 4 May, 1976, beating relegated Wolverhampton Wanderers 3–1 at Molineux. Had they lost,  Queens Park Rangers would have been champions, having beaten Leeds United 2–0 at Loftus Road in their last game. Despite that, QPR still managed to finish in their highest ever position of runners-up and qualified for the UEFA Cup.

Sheffield United's relegation was confirmed on 27 March after losing 5–0 to Tottenham Hotspur. Burnley went down on 19 April after a 1–0 loss at home to Manchester United and Wolverhampton Wanderers went down on the final day of the campaign after their 3–1 loss to Liverpool.

League standings

Results

Managerial changes

Maps

Top scorers

References

RSSSF

Football League First Division seasons
Eng
1975–76 Football League
1975–76 in English football leagues

lt:Anglijos futbolo varžybos 1975–1976 m.
hu:1975–1976-es angol labdarúgó-bajnokság (első osztály)
ru:Футбольная лига Англии 1975-1976